The Pink Album is the debut album of Bognor Regis band Kill Kenada. It was limited to 500 copies. Each album presented in a pink sleeve with a handwritten number written in the bottom right hand corner. The album is only available to buy off the SUBversive Recordings website.

Track listing 

 Psychic Firm
 Graveyards & Parking Lots
 Soap
 K Screams 2 Kill
 Sado Maso
 Hit The Floor
 Kill Konvosation
 Tear It Up
 Choke
 Massachusetts Murder Medallions
 Red And Black
 We Got Down

2005 debut albums